Andreas Poulimenos is a Professor of music at Indiana University at the Jacobs School of Music.

Biography
Poulimenos has both a B.M. and a M.M. from the Boston Conservatory of Music.

Baritone Andreas Poulimenos has made operatic and concert appearances throughout the United States, Canada, Germany, and Switzerland.  Poulimenos was the recipient of a Fulbright Scholarship for study in Rome, Italy.  Former faculty member of Bowling Green State University, Poulimenos has been the recipient of the Faculty of Excellence Award.  His students have won many national and international awards, including an Emmy and a Tony award.  His students enjoy successful careers at internationally acclaimed opera houses, such as the Metropolitan Opera.

References

Operatic baritones
Living people
American male singers
American opera singers
Indiana University faculty
Bowling Green State University faculty
Boston Conservatory at Berklee alumni
Year of birth missing (living people)